Randiana may refer to:

 Randiana, or Excitable Tales, a pornographic novel published by William Lazenby in 1884
 Choenomeles randiana, a species of the genus Choenomeles in the family Rosaceae
 Encyclia randiana, a species of the genus Encyclia
 Hevea randiana, a species of the genus Hevea